William Herbert, 6th Earl of Pembroke, 3rd Earl of Montgomery (c. 1641 – 8 July 1674) was an English nobleman and politician who succeeded to the titles on 11 December 1669 on the death of his father.

Brought up in Wiltshire at Wilton House, he was the son of Philip Herbert, 5th Earl of Pembroke, by his marriage to Penelope Naunton, the daughter of Sir Robert Naunton, Secretary of State to King James I and of Penelope Perrot, a daughter of Sir Thomas Perrot and of Lady Dorothy Devereux (later Countess of Northumberland), whose parents were the famous Earl of Essex and Lettice Knollys.

His mother died before 1647, when he was a small child.

In September 1658, he was granted a pass to travel overseas. He was member of parliament for Glamorgan between 1661 and his elevation to the House of Lords in 1669. After he came into his father's great estates, especially in Wiltshire and in Wales, Pembroke was known to exercise a decisive electoral influence in many places. However, with the Cavalier Parliament enduring from 1661 until 1679, he had few opportunities to wield this influence directly in elections to the House of Commons. From 1665 to 1674, he was Custos Rotulorum of Wiltshire.

Pembroke died unmarried on 8 July 1674 and was succeeded by his brother, Philip Herbert, 7th Earl of Pembroke,  who became known as "the infamous Earl", due to his frequent bouts of homicidal mania.

References

1640s births
1674 deaths
6
William Herbert, 6th Earl of Pembroke
William Herbert, 6th Earl of Pembroke
Members of the Parliament of England (pre-1707) for constituencies in Wales
English MPs 1661–1679